The Big Red Marching Band (also known as The Pride of the Hilltoppers) is the name of the marching band organized by Western Kentucky University. The band was formed in 1925 at what was then Western Kentucky Teachers College. Around 1939 the band became a regular feature at every home game of the WKTC football team and raised its participation above 100 members for the first time. The music department began to expand and establish a chamber wind and symphonic concert band program over the next few decades and by 1993 the band had achieved a total of 170 members.
Today, the band program at WKU boasts several athletic and concert bands and entertains audiences in sports venues and concert halls on the WKU campus, the Commonwealth of Kentucky and the nation. The B.R.M.B. is now over 260 members. 

The Big Red Marching Band (BRMB) performs at all home football games, some away games, local campus and community functions and is a regular exhibition band for high school marching band competitions throughout the region. The BRMB is the most visible ensemble in the WKU Department of Music. The B.R.M.B. has performed on the national level by entertaining at several National Football League games, most notably for the Indianapolis Colts and the Tennessee Titans.

References

Conference USA marching bands
Western Kentucky University
Musical groups established in 1925
Musical groups from Kentucky
1925 establishments in Kentucky